Curtis Oda (born January 4, 1953 in Ogden, Utah) is an American politician and a former Republican member of the Utah House of Representatives. He represented District 14 from January 2005 through January 2017. Oda lives in Clearfield, Utah.

Early life, education, and career
Oda was born in Ogden, Utah. He attended Clearfield High School, and later attended both Weber State University and Utah State University, where he earned degrees in both business administration and economics, and business management and economics. He has been working as a private/casualty insurance agent since 1974, and currently works for Heiners Insurance Center. Oda and his wife, Nancy, have three children.

Political career
Oda served as a State Delegate from 1991-2001 and a Davis County Delegate from 1991-2003 for the Republican Party. He also served as a member of the Davis County Republican Party Platform Committee from 1997-2003, and as a member of the Clearfield City Council from 1996-2003. He was first elected to the Utah House of Representatives on November 2, 2004. During the 2016 legislative session, he served on the House Health and Human Services Committee, and the House Law Enforcement and Criminal Justice Committee.

2016 sponsored legislation

Oda passed six of the ten bills introduced, giving him a 60% passage rate. He also floor sponsored five Senate bills.

Elections
2014 Oda challenged Democrat Cheryl Lynn Phipps in the general election, which he won with 3,386 votes (66.9%) to Phipps's 1,677 votes (3.1%).
2012 Oda was challenged but selected by the Republican convention for the November 6, 2012 general election, which he won with 7,490 votes (71.2%) against Democratic nominee Jon Christensen.
2002 Oda was one of two challengers for District 14 incumbent Republican Representative Don Bush, but Representative Bush went on to win the November 5, 2002 general election against Democratic nominee Todd Weber.
2004 Oda was one of three challengers for Representative Bush, and was one of two selected by the Republican convention for the June 22, 2004 Republican primary, which Oda won with 874 votes (62.6%) and won the November 2, 2004 general election with 4,452 votes (80.4%) against Democratic nominee Tab Uno.
2006 Oda was unopposed for the 2006 Republican primary and won the November 7, 2006 general election with 2,614 votes (63.8%) against Democratic nominee Lawrence Abel, who had run for Utah State Senate in 2002.
2008 Oda was challenged but selected by the Republican convention for the November 4, 2008 general election, which Oda won with 5,280 votes (64%) against Democratic nominee Marcie West.
2010 Oda was unopposed for the June 22, 2010 Republican primary, and won the November 2, 2010 general election with 3,005 votes (65.9%) against Democratic nominee Christopher Williams, his Republican challenger from 2008.

References

External links
 Project Vote Smart: 
 Facebook: 
 Twitter: 
Official page at the Utah State Legislature

Curtis Oda at Ballotpedia
Curtis Oda at OpenSecrets

1953 births
Living people
American politicians of Japanese descent
Republican Party members of the Utah House of Representatives
Asian-American people in Utah politics
People from Clearfield, Utah
Politicians from Ogden, Utah
Utah State University alumni
Weber State University alumni
21st-century American politicians
Utah city council members
Asian-American city council members
Asian conservatism in the United States